MCG+07-33-027 is an isolated spiral galaxy located about 330 million light-years away in the constellation Hercules. It has a very high rate of star formation which would make it a starburst galaxy. Normally, starburst galaxies are triggered by the collision of another galaxy. However most galaxies are in groups or clusters, while MCG+07-33-027 is solitary. Therefore, the cause of the starburst was not due to a collision or by the passing of a nearby galaxy and so the cause of the activity remains unknown.

On April 2, 2005, SN 2005bk, a supernova of type Ic was discovered in MCG+07-33-027.

See also 
 NGC 3034
 Baby Boom Galaxy
 Morphological Catalogue of Galaxies

References

External links 

Spiral galaxies
Hercules (constellation)
56779
Starburst galaxies
+07-33-027
Field galaxies